Bhagirathipur is a village in Dhenkanal district, Odisha, India.

Population
Population of the village is about 2,500.
it's 2900

Economy
The major industries are farming and the making and selling of Kansa basana. People usually travel to Nuahata for their shopping.

Festivals
 Jhamu Jatra

References

External links

Villages in Dhenkanal district